Jane MacDougal Eldredge (born February 8, 1944) is a politician and attorney from the U.S. state of Kansas. She served as a member of the Kansas State Senate from the 2nd district in 1981 and 1982, being replaced by Wint Winter Jr.

Eldredge was born in Norwalk, Connecticut and attended Smith College as an undergraduate. She moved to Kansas and attended the University of Kansas for law school, graduating in 1977 and joining the Kansas Bar the same year. Eldredge served two years in the Kansas State Senate, where she was a member of the Governor's Task Force on Battered Women.

References

Republican Party Kansas state senators
Women state legislators in Kansas
20th-century American politicians
Politicians from Lawrence, Kansas
Smith College alumni
University of Kansas School of Law alumni
20th-century American lawyers
Kansas lawyers
1944 births
Living people
20th-century American women politicians